The 5-inch Forward Firing Aircraft Rocket or FFAR was an American rocket developed during World War II for attack from airplanes against ground and ship targets.

Operational history
The first FFARs were developed by the U.S. Navy and introduced in June 1943.  They had a 3.5-inch diameter and a non-explosive warhead, since they were used as an aircraft-launched ASW (Anti-Submarine Warfare) rocket and worked by puncturing the hull. It was accurate enough for use against surface ships and land targets, but these missions required an explosive warhead. A 5-inch anti-aircraft shell was attached to the 3.5-inch rocket motor, creating the 5-Inch FFAR, which entered service in December 1943.  Performance was limited because of the increased weight, limiting speed to 780 km/h (485 mph).  The High Velocity Aircraft Rocket, or HVAR, was developed to fix this flaw.

The FFAR was used by the Douglas SBD Dauntless (dive bomber), the Grumman TBF Avenger (torpedo bomber) and the Vought F4U Corsair (carrier based fighter).

See also 
 2.75 inch FFAR
 3.5-Inch Forward Firing Aircraft Rocket
 List of rockets
RP-3
 Zuni rocket

References 
Citations

Bibliography

External links

Air-to-ground rockets of the United States
World War II weapons of the United States
Weapons and ammunition introduced in 1943
sv:Forward Firing Aircraft Rocket